William Scott Farmstead, also known as the Roberts House and Ennis Pond House, is a historic home located near Windsor, Isle of Wight County, Virginia. The house was built about 1775, and is a two-story, five bay, gable roofed brick dwelling. It has a rear frame addition dated to the mid- to late-19th century. The front facade features a pedimented one bay porch supported by Doric order columns. The interior retains much of its early Federal interior woodwork.  Also on the property are the contributing servants' quarters, smokehouse, barn, and corn crib.

It was listed on the National Register of Historic Places in 1991.

References

Houses on the National Register of Historic Places in Virginia
Federal architecture in Virginia
Houses completed in 1775
Houses in Isle of Wight County, Virginia
National Register of Historic Places in Isle of Wight County, Virginia
1775 establishments in Virginia